A Diamond for Disease is an EP by Arsis released on October 25, 2005, via Willowtip Records.
The title track, "A Diamond for Disease", took almost four months to write. This release also includes an Alice Cooper cover from the Raise Your Fist and Yell album, and "The Promise of Never" (which is a re-recorded track from the band's 2001 demo, originally titled Fortune's Envy). The EP was mastered by James Murphy, who is best known for his work with Death, Testament, Obituary, and Disincarnate.

Track listing

Personnel
James Malone – vocals, guitars, bass
Mike Van Dyne – drums

Production
Brett Portzer - engineering (drums)
Eyal Levi - engineering, mixing
James Murphy - mastering
Mark Riddick - artwork, layout

References

2005 EPs
Arsis EPs
Willowtip Records EPs